In mathematics, the notion of cylindric algebra, invented by Alfred Tarski, arises naturally in the algebraization of first-order logic with equality. This is comparable to the role Boolean algebras play for propositional logic. Cylindric algebras are Boolean algebras equipped with additional cylindrification operations that model quantification and equality. They differ from polyadic algebras in that the latter do not model equality.

Definition of a cylindric algebra 

 (C1)  

 (C2)  

 (C3)  

 (C4)  

 (C5)  

 (C6)  If , then 

 (C7)  If , then 

Assuming a presentation of first-order logic without function symbols, 
Hence, reformulated using standard logical notations, the axioms read as

 (C1)  

 (C2)  

 (C3)  

 (C4)  

 (C5)  

Cylindric set algebras 
The set X is called the base.

A representation of a cylindric algebra is an isomorphism from that algebra to a cylindric set algebra. Not every cylindric algebra has a representation as a cylindric set algebra. It is easier to connect the semantics of first-order predicate logic with cylindric set algebra. (For more details, see .)

Generalizations 

Cylindric algebras have been generalized to the case of many-sorted logic (Caleiro and Gonçalves 2006), which allows for a better modeling of the duality between first-order formulas and terms.

Relation to monadic Boolean algebra 
 
turns into the axiom

of monadic Boolean algebra. The axiom (C4) drops out (becomes a tautology). Thus monadic Boolean algebra can be seen as a restriction of cylindric algebra to the one variable case.

See also
Abstract algebraic logic
Lambda calculus and Combinatory logic—other approaches to modelling quantification and eliminating variables
Hyperdoctrines are a categorical formulation of cylindric algebras
Relation algebras (RA)
Polyadic algebra
Cylindrical algebraic decomposition

Notes

References
 
 Leon Henkin, J. Donald Monk, and Alfred Tarski (1971) Cylindric Algebras, Part I. North-Holland. .
 Leon Henkin, J. Donald Monk, and Alfred Tarski (1985) Cylindric Algebras, Part II. North-Holland. 
 Robin Hirsch and Ian Hodkinson (2002) Relation algebras by games Studies in logic and the foundations of mathematics, North-Holland

Further reading

External links 
 example of cylindrical algebra by CWoo on planetmath.org

Algebraic logic